Linnéa is a female given name of Swedish origin.

It has two derivations, both of which are linked to the famous 18th-century Swedish scientist Carl Linnaeus, who was ennobled as Carl von Linné later in life. Primarily, people have named their children in his honor; Linnaeus and Linné have been used as given names, usually for boys, and simple modification makes the name gender female.  Secondarily, people have named their children after the twinflower Linnaea; which was itself named to honor Linnaeus.  Linnaeus' family name in turn is derived from the Swedish word "Lind", the linden (lime tree).

Linnéa or Linnea was the seventh most popular given name for girls born in Sweden in 2008 and was the most popular name for girls born in 2008 in Norway. In 2013, it ranked 17 in Sweden and 7 in Norway.  

Some notable people with the name:

 Linnea Ceder, born 2002, Finnish figure skater
 Linnea Dale, born 1991, Norwegian singer
 Linnéa Darell, born 1945, Swedish politician
 Linnea Glatt, born 1942, American artist
 Linnea Gustafsson, born 1986, Swedish orienteering competitor
 Linnea Henriksson, born 1986,  Swedish singer and songwriter
 Linnéa Handberg Lund, born 1976, Danish eurodance musician
 Linnéa Hillberg, 1892–1977, Swedish actress
 Linnea Johnson, born 1946, American poet and feminist writer
 Linnea Mellgren, born 1989, Swedish figure skater
 Linnea Quigley, born 1958, American actress
 Ann Linnea Sandberg, 1938–2009, American immunologist
 Linnea Sinclair, born 1954, American Science Fiction Romance author
 Linnea Torstenson, born 1983, Swedish handball player
 Linnéa Wickman (born 1992), Swedish politician

References

Given names derived from plants or flowers
Swedish feminine given names
Feminine given names
Commemoration of Carl Linnaeus